David Wheaton was the defending champion, but lost in the quarterfinals this year.

Jaime Yzaga won the title, defeating Jimmy Arias 6–3, 7–5 in the final.

Seeds
A champion seed is indicated in bold text while text in italics indicates the round in which that seed was eliminated.

  Michael Chang (quarterfinals)
  Derrick Rostagno (first round)
  David Wheaton (quarterfinals)
  Richey Reneberg (quarterfinals)
  Jimmy Arias (final)
  Scott Davis (first round)
  Jaime Yzaga (champion)
  David Pate (first round)

Draw

External links
 Singles draw

Singles